The 2009 PartyCasino.com Premier League was a professional non-ranking snooker tournament that was played from 3 September to 29 November 2009.

Shaun Murphy won in the final 7–3 against defending champion Ronnie O'Sullivan.

Prize fund 
The breakdown of prize money for this year is shown below:
Winner: £30,000
Runner-up: £15,000
Semi-final: £5,000
Frame-win: £1000
Century-break: £1000
Total: £200,000

League phase 

Top four qualified for the play-offs. If points were level then most frames won determined their positions. If two players had an identical record then the result in their match determined their positions. If that ended 3–3 then the player who got to three first was higher. (Breaks above 50 shown between (parentheses); century breaks are indicated with bold.)

 3 September – Penrith Leisure Centre, Penrith, England
 Neil Robertson 4–2 Judd Trump → 0–(139), (80)–7, (66)–(62), (58) 72–0, (89)–8, 34–75
 Ronnie O'Sullivan 4–2 Marco Fu → 27–71, 66–4, (133)–4, (106) 115–6, (131) 135–0, 0–(83)
 17 September – Malvern Theatres, Great Malvern, England
 Shaun Murphy 2–4 John Higgins → 50–72, 73–24, (53)–77 (53), 28–70 (58), (72)–0, 18–92 (61)
 Stephen Hendry 2–4 Judd Trump → (104) 117–0, (57, 68) 125–0, (51)–70, 29–51, 0–126(103), 0–(88)
 24 September – Southampton Guildhall, Southampton, England
 Neil Robertson 1–5 Stephen Hendry → 32–69 (60), 1–99 (98), 78–4, 19–52, 10–58 (51), 1–133 (127)
 John Higgins 3–3 Marco Fu → (69)–8, 24–65, 60–52, 39–65, (90)–16, 46–66
 1 October – Sands Centre, Carlisle, England
 Marco Fu 2–4 Judd Trump → 19–(100), (82)–0, 25–75, 61–63, 6–(120), (81)–0
 Ronnie O'Sullivan 3–3 Neil Robertson → (52) 75–48, 6–84 (77), (112) 113–14, 86–42, 0–117 (91), 4–72
 15 October – AECC, Aberdeen, Scotland
 Ronnie O'Sullivan 4–2 Shaun Murphy → (104)–0, 68–1, (56) 89–5, 0–101 (81), 45–84, (75) 85–5
 John Higgins 3–3 Stephen Hendry → 54–65, 36–(76), (92)–0, (73) 92–0, 70–1, 5–71 (64)
 22 October – Grimsby Auditorium, Grimsby, England
 Ronnie O'Sullivan 3–3 Stephen Hendry → 1–75 (51), 38–65, (78)–0, 0–(76), (95) 99–0, 68–7
 Shaun Murphy 5–1 Marco Fu → 1–117 (91), 63–14, (62) 88–5, (105)–0, (134)–0, (62) 92–7
 29 October – Guildhall, Preston, England
 John Higgins 4–2 Neil Robertson → 69–51, 41–66, 70–28, (73)–34, (63) 80–28, 17–50
 Shaun Murphy 3–3 Stephen Hendry → 75–50, (55) 75–26, 4–110 (68), 6–100 (96), 54–19, 23–66
 5 November – Riverside Leisure Centre, Devon, England
 Marco Fu 2–4 Neil Robertson → 54–14, 19–84, 41–71, (90) 95–0, 63–70, 58–60
 Ronnie O'Sullivan 2–4 Judd Trump → 33–80 (67), 93–8, 0–(79), 20–81 (50), 65–69, (50) 87–8
 12 November – Hutton Moor Leisure Centre, Weston-super-Mare, England
 John Higgins 4–2 Judd Trump → 7–35, (63)–(65), 40–65, (53) 88–79, (74) 78–5, (75) 107–1
 Shaun Murphy 4–2 Neil Robertson → 68–37, (59) 75–99, (104) 119–6, (64) 73–8, 0–(109), 94–8
 19 November – Venue Cymru, Llandudno, Wales
 Marco Fu 5–1 Stephen Hendry → 64–40, (70)–25, 14–72, 98–15, 71–15, (122) 128–11
 Ronnie O'Sullivan 2–4 John Higgins → 9–(72), 16–70 (64), (129) 134–0, 0–(107), 0–128 (119), (68) 76–48
 Shaun Murphy 2–4 Judd Trump → 78–66, 11–64 (63), 39–63, 75–22, 43–57, 50–64

Play-offs 
28–29 November – Potters Leisure Resort, Hopton-on-Sea, England

* (61) 80–35, 4–80, (96)–0, 0–(110), 34–77, 61–71 (65), 67–1, 40–75
** 0–(98), 10–99 (53), 10–68 (66), 1–83 (76), (63)–30, (53)–(67)
*** (111) 119–9, 87–36, 70–0, 50–57, 0–(88), 61–67, 75–27, (75) 126–3, (63)–0, (67) 75–(67)

Qualifiers 

The qualification for this tournament, the Championship League was played in eight groups from 5 January to 26 March 2009.

Century breaks 

139, 120, 103, 100  Judd Trump
134, 110, 105, 104  Shaun Murphy
133, 131, 129, 112, 106, 104  Ronnie O'Sullivan
127, 111, 104  Stephen Hendry
122  Marco Fu
119, 107  John Higgins
109  Neil Robertson

References

External links
 

Premier League Snooker
Premier League
Premier League Snooker